Sree Neelakanta Government Sanskrit College Pattambi (SNGS) is a NAAC A+ graded government college located in Pattambi of Palakkad district in Kerala, India.  It is recognized as the ‘Centre of Excellence’ in the field of higher education by Government of Kerala.

History
The college was founded by a renowned Sanskrit scholar Punnasseri Nambi Neelakanta Sharma. The college initially, started as a Sanskrit school in 1899, was upgraded to the ‘Central Sanskrit College’ for training for ‘Vidwan’ and ‘Siromani’ titles under the University of Madras in 1911. Later the college accredited under University of Calicut.

Academic Programmes
SNGC offers eleven undergraduate, six postgraduate and four research programs in arts, science and commerce through sixteen departments, affiliated to the University of Calicut.

Notable alumni

 Kuttikrishna Marar
 P. Kunhiraman Nair
 M. P. Sankunni Nair
 K. P. Narayana Pisharody
 V. M. Girija

References

External links
 

Colleges in Kerala
Universities and colleges in Palakkad district
Colleges affiliated with the University of Calicut
Academic institutions formerly affiliated with the University of Madras
1899 establishments in India